The Landers Peaks are a group of peaks  east of Mount Braun, rising to about  between Palestrina Glacier and Nichols Snowfield in the northern portion of Alexander Island, Antarctica. They were named by the Advisory Committee on Antarctic Names for Commander Robert J. Landers, U.S. Navy, an LC-130 aircraft pilot in Squadron VXE-6 during U.S. Navy Operation Deep Freeze, 1965 and 1966.

See also
 Lamina Peak
 Mimas Peak
 Saint George Peak

References

Mountains of Alexander Island